General elections were held in Tonga on 16 November 2017 to elect 17 of the 26 seats to the Legislative Assembly. King Tupou VI dissolved the Assembly on 25 August 2017 on the advice of its Speaker, Sialeʻataongo Tuʻivakanō, who claimed that Prime Minister ʻAkilisi Pohiva was attempting to claim powers held by the King and Privy Council within Cabinet.

Nominations closed on 27 September, with 86 candidates contesting the 17 people's seats. The election resulted in a victory for the DPFI, with ʻAkilisi Pōhiva remaining as Prime Minister.

Electoral system
The Legislative Assembly of Tonga has up to 30 members, of which 17 are directly elected by first-past-the-post voting from single-member constituencies. The island of Tongatapu has ten constituencies, Vavaʻu three, Haʻapai two and ʻEua and Niuatoputapu/Niuafoʻou one each. Nine seats are held by members of the nobility who elect representatives amongst themselves. The Cabinet formed by a Prime Minister may include up to four members not elected to the Assembly, who then automatically become members of the legislature.

Results 
The Democratic Party of the Friendly Islands won 14 seats, enough to allow them to form a government without needing the support of nobles or independents.

People's Seats

By constituency

Nobles

References

Tonga
2017 in Tonga
Elections in Tonga
Election and referendum articles with incomplete results
November 2017 events in Oceania